Neoheterophrictus smithi is a species of  tarantulas, native to India.

Etymology
The specific name smithi is in honour of Andrew M. Smith, who helped the authors with their project.

Characteristics
Neoheterophrictus smithi mainly differs from other species of Neoheterophrictus by the presence of a long, thin spine on the base of the primary tibial apophysis. The primary tibial apophysis also ends in a spine. It has no sub-apical swelling as in N. amboli.

References

Theraphosidae
Spiders of the Indian subcontinent
Spiders described in 2014